Banipal is an independent literary magazine dedicated to the promotion of contemporary Arab literature through translations in English. It was founded in London in 1998 by Margaret Obank and Samuel Shimon. The magazine is published three times a year. Since its inception, it has published works and interviews of numerous Arab authors and poets, many of them translated for the first time into English. It is also co-sponsor of the Saif Ghobash–Banipal Prize for Arabic Literary Translation.

As of December 2020, 69 issues of Banipal were published. Each issue usually focuses on a specific theme, recent issues focusing on Libyan fiction, Arab American authors, Iraqi authors, Literature in Yemen Today, Writing in Dutch, etc. The magazine has been praised both by non-Arab and Arab commentators - Gamal el-Ghitani, James Kirkup, Anton Shammas among others - for its role in diffusing Arab literature to a wider audience. The Iraqi poet, novelist and translator Fadhil Al Azzawi has said:

Contemporary authors featured in Banipal

 Abbas Beydhoun
 Abdel Aziz al-Maqalih
 Abdellatif Laâbi
 Abdelrahman Munif
 Abdelwahab Meddeb
 Abdullah Laroui
 Abdul Kader el-Janabi
 Abdu Khal
 Abdul Wahab al-Bayati
 Adunis
 Ahmad Ali El Zein
 Ahmad Zein
 Ahmed Fagih
 Ahmed Bouzfour
 Ahmed Rashid Thani
 Ala Hlehel
 Alawiyya Subh
 Albert Cossery
 Ali al-Domaini
 Ali al-Kasimi
 Ali al-Muqri
 Ali Mohammed Zayd
 Amjad Nasser
 Anton Shammas
 Aroussia Naluti
 Aziz Chouaki
 Badr Shakir al-Sayyab
 Baha Eddine Taoud
 Bassam Frangieh
 Bassam Shamseldin
 Bensalim Himmich
 Denys Johnson-Davies
 Diya al-Jubaily
 Driss Chraïbi
 Edward al-Kharrat
 Edward Said
 Elias Khoury
 Etel Adnan
 Ezzat el-Kamhawi
 Fadhil al-Azzawi
 Fady Joudeh
 Fathi Abul Nasr
 Ferial Ghazoul
 Fuad al-Takarli
 Gamal el-Ghitani
 Ghalib Halasa
 Ghassan Zaqtan
 Ghazi Algosaibi
 Habib Abdulrab Sarori
 Habib Selmi
 Habib Tengour
 Haifa Bitar
 Halim Barakat
 Hanan al-Shaykh
 Hani al-Raheb
 Hassan Abdulrazzak
 Hassan Daoud
 Hassan Nasr
 Hassouna Mosbahi
 Hoda Barakat
 Huda Ablan
 Hussain al-Mozany
 Huzama Habayeb
 Ibrahim Nasrallah
 Ibtisam Abdallah
 Inaya Jaber
 Ines Abassi
 Issa J Boullata
 Jalil al-Qaisi
 Jamal Mahjoub
 Jamila Omairah
 Kadhim Jihad
 Kamal Abdellatif
 Kamal Ruhayyim
 Khaled Mattawa
 Khalid Albudoor
 Khulood Al Mu’alla
 Lamia Makaddam
 Lisa Suhair Majaj
 Luay Hamza Abbas
 Lutfiya al-Dulaimi
 Mahdi Issa al-Saqr
 Mahmood Abdel Wahab
 Mahmoud Darwish
 Mahmoud Shukair
 Mai Ghoussoub
 Miled Faiza
 Miral al-Tahawy
 Mohamed al-Bisatie
 Mohamed Choukri
 Mohamed Salah al-Azab
 Mohammad al-Maghut
 Mohammad al-Qaood
 Mohammad al-Shaibani
 Mohammad Ali Farhat
 Mohammad Khodayyi
 Mohammed Al-Harthi
 Mohammed Bennis
 Mohammed Khaïr-Eddine
 Mohammed Mustagab
 Mohammed Zefzaf
 Mohja Kahf
 Mona Yahia
 Mouayed al-Rawi
 Nabila al-Zubair
 Nadia Alkowkobani
 Naguib Mahfouz
 Najwa Barakat
 Nassif Falak
 Nazih Abu Afash
 Nazik al-Malaika
 Nazum al-Obeidi
 Nirvana Tanoukhi
 Nizar Qabbani
 Nouri al-Jarrah
 Nujoom Al-Ghanem
 Ounsi el Hage
 Paul Chaoul
 Qassim Haddad
 Rabee Jaber
 Rachid al-Daif
 Rachida Lamrabet
 Rafik Schami
 Ramsey Nasr
 Rasha Omran
 Rashad Abu Shawar
 Sa'adallah Wannus
 Saadi Youssef
 Said al-Kafrawi
 Saif al-Rahbi
 Salah Hassan
 Salim Barakat
 Salwa al-Neimi
 Samar Yazbek
 Samir Albufattah
 Samir Naqqash
 Saniya Salih
 Sargon Boulus
 Sawsan al-Areeqi
 Shawqi Shafiq
 Tahar Ben Jelloun
 Tayeb Salih
 Turki al-Hamad
 Vénus Khoury-Ghata
 Wacini Laradg
 Wajdi al-Ahdal
 Wilfred Thesiger
 Yasmine Khlat
 Yasser Abdel Baqi
 Yasser Abdel Hafez
 Youssef Rakha
 Yusef Habshi al-Ashqar
 Zakariyya Tamer

References

External links
 Official website

Literary magazines published in the United Kingdom
Magazines published in London
Magazines established in 1998
Triannual magazines published in the United Kingdom
Literary translation magazines